Ichthyodes floccosa is a species of beetle in the family Cerambycidae. It was described by Pascoe in 1867.

References

Ichthyodes
Beetles described in 1867